The Oxford Hotel, also known as the West Baden Springs Hotel, is a historic hotel building located at West Baden Springs, Orange County, Indiana.  It was built about 1910, and is a large three-story, rectangular, brick building.  It features cast iron storefronts and a pitched roof with straight and stepped parapets.

It was listed on the National Register of Historic Places in 2001.

References 

Hotel buildings on the National Register of Historic Places in Indiana
Hotel buildings completed in 1910
Buildings and structures in Orange County, Indiana
National Register of Historic Places in Orange County, Indiana